Peace River (French Rivière-la-Paix or Rivière de la Paix) is a river in British Columbia and Alberta. Peace River may also refer to:

Canada
Peace River Country, a geographic region straddling the border between British Columbia and Alberta
Peace River Block, a land grant of the Canadian Pacific Railway within the Peace River Country
Peace River oil sands, a large deposit of oil sands in the Peace River watershed.
Peace River, Alberta, a town in northwest Alberta 
Peace River (electoral district), a federal electoral district in Alberta
Peace River (provincial electoral district), a provincial electoral district in Alberta
Peace River (British Columbia electoral district), a former provincial electoral district in British Columbia
Peace River North, originally named North Peace River, a provincial electoral district in British Columbia
Peace River South, originally named South Peace River, a provincial electoral district in British Columbia
Peace River Regional District, a regional district in northeastern British Columbia
Peace River (meteorite), a meteorite fallen in 1963 in Alberta

United States
Peace River (Dillingham) in Alaska, called Gui-guok-lok by natives 
Peace River (Nome) in Alaska, a tributary of the Koyuk River
Peace River (Florida) in Florida

See also
Steamboats of the Peace River